Uzarići is a village in the Široki Brijeg in the West Herzegovina Canton of the Federation of Bosnia and Herzegovina in Bosnia and Herzegovina.

Demographics 
According to the 2013 census, its population was 1,789.

References

Populated places in Široki Brijeg